A Tower of Silence, or Dakhma, is a Zoroastrian structure used for exposure of the dead.

Tower of Silence may also refer to:
The Tower of Silence (film), a 1924 German film directed by Johannes Guter
Towers of Silence (film), a 1952 West German adventure film directed by Hans Bertram 
The Tower of Silence (album), a 2012 album by Steve Adey
The Tower of Silence (novel), a 2013 novel by Phiroshaw Jamsetjee Chevalier
The Towers of Silence, a 1971 novel by Paul Scott